Hermann Raich (2 May 1934 – 9 October 2009) was the first Roman Catholic bishop of the Roman Catholic Diocese of Wabag in Papua New Guinea.

Born in Jerzens, Austria, Raich was ordained to the priesthood on 29 April 1962. On 8 March 1982, Pope John Paul II appointed Raich bishop, and he was ordained a bishop on 29 April 1982. Bishop Raich retired on 30 June 2008.

Notes

20th-century Austrian Roman Catholic priests
20th-century Roman Catholic bishops in Papua New Guinea
1934 births
2009 deaths
21st-century Roman Catholic bishops in Papua New Guinea
Roman Catholic bishops of Wabag
Austrian expatriates in Papua New Guinea
Expatriate bishops